Marion Bidder (née Greenwood) (26 August 1862 – 25 September 1932) was an English physiologist and one of the first women to do independent research in Cambridge. For nearly a decade, she was in charge of the Balfour Laboratory in Cambridge and in 1895 she was the first woman to speak about a paper she had written at a Royal Society meeting.

Early life and education
Born in the Yorkshire region of England, her family moved to Oxenhope in 1869. Her parents were Agnes and George Greenwood. Her father was a lay preacher and a shipping agent. She attended to Bradford Girls' Grammar School and won a scholarship to attend Girton College when she was 17 years old. She graduated with honours in natural sciences. She was the first winner of the Gamble Prize in 1888 for her dissertation.

While doing research at Newnham College, she wrote papers on the gastric glands of pigs, effects of nicotine on invertebrates, and the physiology of protozoa. These papers appeared in the Journal of Physiology.

Career

Starting in 1888, she acted as both a lecturer and director of studies in biology as well as a tutor for female physiology students at Newnham College. Greenwood lead the Balfour Laboratory from 1890. When she married marine biologist George Parker Bidder and gave up the position 11 years later in 1899, it took four people to replace her.

After marrying, Bidder continued to publish works, however they were on the subject of domestic economy. In 1901, Domestic Economy in Theory and Practice was published, to which Bidder contributed on the theoretical and scientific aspects of the subject.

Later life
Bidder was president of the Cambridge Women's Liberal Association and was passionate about women becoming involved in town councils. She also held the position of vice-chairman of the Cambridgeshire Voluntary Association for Mental Welfare. She was a governor of both Homerton Teacher Training College in Cambridge and of Girton College. She served as governor of Girton College until her death, she died of tuberculosis on September 25, 1932.

Her daughter Anna McClean Bidder was a leading zoologist and academic.

See also
Timeline of women in science

References

Women physiologists
English physiologists
English women scientists
1862 births
1932 deaths
19th-century British women scientists
20th-century British women scientists
19th-century English women
19th-century English people
20th-century English women
20th-century English people